Ghost, in comics, may refer to:

Ghost (Dark Horse Comics), a superhero and star of her own series, published in the 1990s and revived in 2012
Ghosts (comics), an anthology of tales of the supernatural
Ghost (Marvel Comics), a supervillain and foe of Iron Man
Ghost (Nedor Comics), a Nedor Comics superhero from the Golden Age of Comics
Ghost, a foe of Captain Atom in Charlton and later DC Comics

It may also refer to:

Ghost Girl, a Marvel Comics character
Ghost Rider
The Phantom Rider, a Western-themed character originally known as the Ghost Rider.
The Gay Ghost, or the Grim Ghost, a DC Comics character
Gentleman Ghost, or the Ghost, a DC Comics villain
The Grim Ghost, an Atlas/Seaboard Comics character
Casper, a funny looking "do-good" ghost in Harvey Comics

See also
Ghost (disambiguation)